Philippine Economic Zone Authority (PEZA), formerly known as Export Processing Zone Authority (EPZA), is a government agency in the Philippines attached to the Department of Trade and Industry created to help promote investments in the export-oriented manufacturing industry into the country by assisting investors in registering and facilitating their business operations and providing tax incentives. PEZA also assists investors who locate in service facilities inside selected areas in the country (areas are called PEZA Special Economic Zones) which are usually business process outsourcing and knowledge process outsourcing firms. Other activities also eligible for PEZA registration and incentives include establishment and operation within special economic zones for tourism, medical tourism, logistics and warehousing services, economic zone development and operation and facilities providers.

History and organization
On November 20, 1972, the Export Processing Zone Authority (EPZA) was created through Presidential Decree 66, with the first official economic zone in the Philippines is Bataan Export Processing Zone (BEPZ), later became Freeport Area of Bataan in June 30, 2010, in Mariveles, Bataan. The Cavite Export Processing Zone (CEPZ) was then later created on May 30, 1980 through PD 1980.

On February 21, 1995, EPZA became PEZA due to the enactment of Republic Act 7916 which was passed by the House of Representatives and the Senate and approved by former Philippine President Fidel V. Ramos. As provided in the Special Economic Zone Act, the PEZA Board is chaired by the Secretary of the Department of Trade and Industry. Vice-Chair is the Director General (Chief Executive Officer) of PEZA. Members of the Board are Undersecretaries representing nine (9) key government Departments, to ensure efficient coordination between PEZA and their respective Departments on matters pertaining to investors' operations inside the Special Economic Zones.

Incentives
PEZA offers both fiscal and non-fiscal incentives as well as ready-to-occupy business locations in world-class economic zones and IT parks or buildings. Fiscal incentives include: income tax holiday for a certain number of years, which translates to 100% exemption from corporate income tax; tax and duty-free importation of raw materials, capital equipment, machineries and spare parts; exemption from wharfage dues and export tax, impost or fees; VAT zero-rating of local purchases subject to compliance with BIR and PEZA requirements; exemption from payment of any and all local government imposts, fees, licenses or taxes; and exemption from expanded withholding tax. Non-fiscal incentives, on the other hand, include simplified import-export procedures, extended visa facilitation assistance to foreign nationals and spouses and dependents; special visa multiple entry privileges; and more.

Firms

As of February 2019, PEZA has over 396 fully operating economic zones that are spread across the country. Aside from central business districts in Bonifacio Global City, Makati, Ortigas and Quezon City, there are also economic zones in other next-wave cities such as Batangas, Cebu, Baguio, Subic, Iloilo, Dumaguete, Pampanga and more. Currently, PEZA-accredited buildings and office spaces are mostly in Makati with over 35 operating economic zones including Glorietta 1 and 2 BPO, PBCom Tower, and the Zuellig Building. In Fort Bonifacio or Bonifacio Global City, there are 17 operating economic zones, including Bonifacio Technology Center, Sun Life Centre, Picadilly Star, World Plaza and EcoTower. In Quezon City, there are 18 operating economic zones including the ABS-CBN's ELJ Communications Center in Diliman. In Pampanga, there is one economic zone, Alviera Industrial Park. PEZA previously operated and managed the Bataan Export Processing Zone (later Bataan Economic Zone) in Mariveles, Bataan until its conversion to Freeport Area of Bataan (FAB), turnover of the zone's operations and management from PEZA to Authority of the Freeport Area of Bataan (AFAB), and abolishment of BEZ on President Gloria Macapagal Arroyo's last day as President of the Philippines and Benigno Aquino III became president on June 30, 2010.

List of Director General of PEZA (1995 to Present)

 Lilia B. de Lima - February 1995 to June 2016
 Justo Porfirio Ll. Yusingco (Officer-In-Charge) - July to October 2016
 BGen. Charito B. Plaza, MNSA PhD. - October 2016 to June 2022
 Tereso O. Panga (Officer-In-Charge) - July 2022 to Present

References

Government agencies established in 1972
1972 establishments in the Philippines
Government-owned and controlled corporations of the Philippines
Department of Trade and Industry (Philippines)
Special economic zones
Establishments by Philippine presidential decree